Exposure is the fourth novel in the Virals series of novels for young adults written by the American forensic anthropologist and crime writer, Kathy Reichs and her son Brendan Reichs, featuring Tory Brennan, great-niece of Temperance Brennan.

Plot
The story starts some time after the ending of Code, the third book in the series. However, it's not long before things start to go wrong. Twins Lucy and Peter Gable, classmates of the Virals, have been kidnapped, and the police seem baffled. The Virals decide to investigate, but matters become worse when Tory's best female friend, Ella, goes missing as well. And Ben and Tory begin to have a bond closer than ever.

External links
Virals series official website

Novels by Kathy Reichs
American young adult novels
2014 American novels
Novels set in South Carolina
G. P. Putnam's Sons books